Joseph Smith Fletcher (7 February 1863 – 30 January 1935) was an English journalist and author. He wrote more than 230 books on a wide variety of subjects, both fiction and non-fiction, and was one of the most prolific English writers of detective fiction.

Early life and education 
Fletcher was born in Halifax, West Yorkshire, the son of a clergyman. His father died when he was eight months old, and after which his grandmother raised him on a farm in Darrington, near Pontefract. He was educated at Silcoates School in Wakefield, and after some study of law, he became a journalist.

Writing career 
At age 20, Fletcher began working in journalism, as a sub-editor in London. He subsequently returned to his native Yorkshire, where he worked first on the Leeds Mercury using the pseudonym A Son of the Soil, and then as a special correspondent for the Yorkshire Post covering Edward VII's coronation in 1902.

Fletcher's first books published were poetry. He then moved on to write numerous works of historical fiction and history, many dealing with Yorkshire, which led to his selection as a fellow of the Royal Historical Society.

Michael Sadleir stated that Fletcher's historical novel, When Charles I Was King (1892), was his best work. Fletcher wrote several novels of rural life in imitation of Richard Jefferies, beginning with The Wonderful Wapentake (1894).

In 1914, Fletcher wrote his first detective novel and went on to write over a hundred more, many featuring the private investigator Ronald Camberwell.

Fletcher published multiple crime fiction novels during the "Golden Age of Detective Fiction," namely his The Middle Temple Murder (1919) which served as the basic formulaic template for writing detective fiction novels; though, this particular novel (in addition to many of his others) did not share many general traits with those that characterize this particular literary era. On the contrary, it's argued that Fletcher is an almost exact contemporary of Conan Doyle. Most of his detective fiction works considerably pre-date that era, and even those few published within it do not conform to the closed form and strict rules professed, if not unfailingly observed, by the Golden Age writers.

Personal life 
He married the Irish writer Rosamond Langbridge in 1927, with whom he had one son, Rev. Valentine Fletcher, who held various ministries across Yorkshire, including Bradford and Sedbergh, and was himself a writer, author of various children's books and of Chimney Pots and Stacks, on the British domestic chimney pot.

Death 
Fletcher died in Surrey 1935, one week short of his 72nd birthday.  He was survived by his wife Rosamond and son Valentine.

Works

Novels 
Frank Carisbroke's Stratagem (1888)
Andrewlina (1889)
Mr. Spivey's Clerk (1890)
When Charles the First Was King (1892)
In the Days of Drake (1895)
Where Highways Cross (1895)
Mistress Spitfire (1896)
Baden Powell of Mafeking (1900)
Lucian the Dreamer (1903)
Perris of the Cherry-Trees (1913)
The King versus Wargrave (1915)
The Rayner-Slade Amalgamation (1917)
Paul Campenhaye (1918)
The Chestermarke Instinct (1918)
The Borough Treasurer (1919)
The Middle Temple Murder (1919)
The Talleyrand Maxim (1919)
Scarhaven Keep (1920)
The Herapath Property (1920)
The Lost Mr. Linthwaite (1920)
The Orange-Yellow Diamond (1920)
The Markenmore Mystery (1921)
The Root of All Evil (1921)
Wrychester Paradise (1921)
In the Mayor's Parlour (1922)
Ravensdene Court (1922)
The Middle of Things (1922)
The Million Dollar Diamond (1923)
The Charing Cross Mystery (1923)
The Mazaroff Murder (1923)
The Kang-He Vase (1924)
The Safety Pin (1924)
Sea Fog (1925)
The Bedford Row Mystery (1925)
The Cartwright Gardens Murder (1925)
The Mill of Many Windows (1925)
The Passenger to Folkestone (1927)
Dead Men's Money (1928)
The Ransom for London (1929)
Murder at Wrides Park (1931)
Murder in Four Degrees (1931)
Murder of the Ninth Baronet (1932)
Murder in the Squire's Pew (1932)
The Borgia Cabinet (1932)
The Solution of a Mystery (1932)
Todmanhawe Grange (completed after his death by Edward Powys Mathers as Torquemada, 1937)

Short Stories 
Miscellaneous Stories (1907)
Mr. Poskitt's Nightcaps (1910)
The Secret of the Barbican and Other Stories (1924)
Green Ink and other stories (1926)

 Poetry The Juvenile Poems of Joseph S. Fletcher (1879)Early Poems by Joseph Smith Fletcher (1882)Anima Christi (1884)

 References 

 Further reading 
Ellis, Roger and Richard Williams, J. S. Fletcher: A Bibliographical Checklist of the British First Editions''. Dragonby Press, 2013.

External links 
 
 
 
 
 
 

1863 births
1935 deaths
British male journalists
20th-century English novelists
British mystery writers
English historical novelists
Fellows of the Royal Historical Society
People from Halifax, West Yorkshire
People educated at Silcoates School
English male novelists
English crime fiction writers
British detective fiction writers
20th-century English male writers
Writers of historical fiction set in the early modern period